Aamras (also known as amras) is a sweet dish featuring in the cuisine of the Indian subcontinent and made from the pulp of the mango fruit. The pulp of a ripe mango is extracted, usually by hand, and is consumed together with pooris or chapati (Indian breads). Sometimes ghee and milk are added to the pulp to enhance its flavour. Sugar is also added to adjust the sweetness. It is often had at celebrations and weddings with cardamon and chopped fruits.

A regional version of aamras is a popular dessert in Rajasthani cuisine and Marwari, Marathi, and Gujarati homes, especially during festivities.

Since the fruit is seasonal, being harvested at the end of summer, the need to preserve the fruit in the form of pulp has given rise to a moderately large mango-processing industry.

Etymology
The word "aamras" is derived from the Sanskrit words āmra (Sanskrit: आम्र, lit. mango) and rasa (Sanskrit: रस, lit. juice), so the literal meaning is "mango juice".

Panhe
Panhe is sweet drink made from the pulp of boiled raw mangoes and is a traditional summertime drink in Maharashtra, where it helps in tolerating the increased seasonal heat. The pulp is mixed with sugar in a 2:1 ratio and then sufficient water is added to make it suitable for drinking.

Keri no ras
Aamras is also a traditional Gujarati dish (called as કેરીનો રસ (kerī-no ras)). It consists of sugared mango pulp, which is passed through muslin to remove fibrous strands of the fruit.  It is commonly eaten with rotil or pooris.

List of sweetmeats produced from processing the pulp 
Several sweetmeats produced from the processed pulp are very popular among the Maharastrian community.
Amba Barfi: The pulp is mixed with sugar and reduced to a thick paste by boiling. The reduced pulp is then mixed with khoa (milk solids) and chopped nuts. The mixture is allowed to cool in large flat pans and cut into cubes before packaging.
Amba Poli: The pulp is mixed with sugar and sundried on flat steel plates. The dried pulp forms stiff layers which are stacked on top of each other. The stacks are then cut into large squares before packaging.
Ambebhat: The pulp is mixed with sugar and nuts, then cooked along with boiled white rice. Once the pulp is reduced and evenly coats the rice grains, the Ambebath is ready to be consumed.
Ambyacha Shira: The pulp is mixed with sugar and nuts, then cooked along with semolina in water or milk. Once cooked, the mixture looks like an amber-coloured paste and is ready to be consumed.

References

External links
 

Mangoes
Indian drinks